Acanthophippium javanicum is a species of orchid and the type species of its genus. It is found in West Malaysia, Borneo, Java, Sumatra and New Guinea.

References

External links 
 
 

javanicum
Orchids of Malaysia
Orchids of New Guinea
Orchids of Borneo
Orchids of Sumatra
Orchids of Java